Jean-Baptiste de La Croix de Chevrières de St. Vallier (November 14, 1653 – December 26, 1727) is most known as Quebec's second bishop. Born in the southeastern French city of Grenoble in 1653, to a wealthy land owning family, Saint-Vallier swiftly became a community figure, known for founding a hospital in St. Valier. His officious and dominating personality, led him to accept the position of bishop in 1685 at the call of Louis XIV and François de Laval, former Bishop of Quebec. Often referred to as Abbé Saint-Vallier, he was a controversial figure as Bishop of Quebec, since he rarely listened to advice. He spent large amounts of money that left the seminary in great debt at the time of death in 1727. He was deeply involved in the Catholic reform tradition and promoted several missions throughout Canada.

He was seen as a very strict leader for most of his reign. He refused demands for his resignations both by the King and the religious of New France. He was suspected of Jansenism, and his administration of the diocese led to popular revolts and struggles with various religious groups. Accomplishments during his 42-year reign include: the founding of the Hôpital-Général de Québec (1692); the edifice for the bishop (1688); commissioning architect Hilaire Bernard de La Rivière to build Notre-Dame-des-Victoires Church; and the installations of religious reformist communities in the Montreal area. The development of the Roman Catholic Archdiocese of Quebec and Roman Catholic faith was his utmost priority and interest; he was particularly sensible on the point of morality, which he believed was failing in his see. He was also greatly involved with the Society of Foreign Missions of Paris.

Biography 

Born November 14, 1653 to Jean de La Croix de Chevrières de Saint-Vallier and Marie de Sayve, Jean-Baptiste was part of the La Croix family, known to be ranked among the best in Dauphiné with prestigious posts such as country noblemen, officers, magistrates and ambassadors. Jean-Baptiste's father was a Grenoble magistrate and worked for the diplomatic services and his grandfather was a lawyer and poet, then a judge at the Parliament of Grenoble. The La Croixs owned a large amount of land including the castle of Saint-Vallier in the Rhone, which previously belonged to King Henry II's mistress, Diane de Poitiers.

This was where Jean-Baptiste spent most of his childhood. However, little is known about him during that period besides his charitable deeds and his education at the Jesuit College in Grenoble. The La Croix children were much influenced by religion; three out of ten entered religious life. Jean-Baptiste entered the seminary of Saint-Sulpice in Paris and obtained his licentiate in theology in 1672 at 19 years of age. In 1676, he was appointed almoner-in-ordinary to King Louis XIV, a promotion that can be attributed to his family's connections. He was ordained priest in 1681. He personally funded a small hospital in Saint-Vallier in 1683.

Jean-Baptiste was known for his austerity, his strong will and his dynamism. He was a close friend of the bishop of Grenoble, Le Camus, and would regularly visit hospitals, prisons and country parishes. At the court of the "Sun King", he kept his religious attire.

Ideology 
Saint-Valier was a supporter of the Counter Reformation. His initial intent in the New World was to engage in the conversion of the indigenous residents. He introduced Jesuits and Recollects in an attempt to evangelize New France. Many of these missions (Illinois, Louisiana, and Mississippi) resulted in conflicts between Bishop Saint-Vallier, the Jesuits and the seminary of Quebec.

His various construction projects reflect a desire to restore and renew the authority in the Catholic Church as the main institution of administrative organization. In 1697, Saint-Valier built a palace in Quebec for his clergy and as a place of hospitality. During the same year, he also established a nuns monastery in Trois-Rivières Saint-Vallier's zeal for religious activities and establishments, stretched from Quebec, Montreal, Acadia and Louisiana. His way of life embodied that of the ideals of the Council of Trent.

Diocese of Quebec 

The Diocese of Quebec was vast and its population diverse and widespread. It included the whole of French North America, or what was called New France, divided in seven colonies: Newfoundland, Acadia, Île Royale, Louisiana, Illinois, Upper Country and Canada, inhabited by Indigenous people and the European settlers. During the tenure of Saint-Vallier, immigration from France was mostly over; the European colonists were farmers, fishermen, sailors, merchants and ‘coureurs des bois’, overseen by a small elite of aristocratic leaders, but a great demographic explosion occurred between 1685 and 1730, the white population in New France jumping from c. 12,000 inhabitants to c. 41,500.

During the same time, the number of Amerindian fell from c. 163,500 to c. 61,500. That loss, mainly in the tribes of Louisiana, was attributed to warfare and diseases brought to the valley of the Mississippi. The number of Aboriginals compared to white settlers is one reason for the presence of so many religious orders in New France. The missions and conversions to Christianity were deemed very important.

Priests of the Missions Étrangères of Paris, the Jesuits, the Recollets and the Sulpicians often worked in collaboration with the nuns from different orders like the Congrégation de Notre-Dame or the Canonesses of St. Augustine of the Mercy of Jesus at l’Hôtel-Dieu de Québec. The arrival of Saint-Vallier and his strong views on what should be the duties of the priests created a shock wave in the orders, especially for the Seminary of Quebec, newly founded by his predecessor Bishop Laval.

Beginnings as bishop 

Advancing quickly in the religious and social hierarchies, it was but a matter of time before Saint-Vallier would be elevated to the rank of bishop. In 1685, Mgr de Laval, Bishop of Quebec, gave his resignation to the King and proposed Saint-Vallier to replace him. His entourage first pushed him to refuse the see, since the Diocese of Quebec was relatively new, poor, far from court and at that time "perhaps the most wretched and difficult of all the dioceses in mission lands". Abbot Saint-Vallier finally decided to accept the position, and left France for a sojourn in his future see with the title of vicar general of Bishop Laval, since the ceremony of his investiture had to be postponed due to the difficult relationship between the Pope Innocent XI and Louis XIV.

His first stay in Canada lasted a year and a half. Saint-Vallier surprised the clergy with his passion and energy. His trip started in Quebec, down to the parishes along the St. Lawrence River, Montreal and then to Acadia. During this time, he preached to both the French and the Indians. In 1686, he debated going further into the Great Lakes in order to continue his investigations.

However, his strong personality intimidated people. The superiors of the seminary later wrote to Bishop Laval that they believed he wasn't a suitable candidate for the task of governing the Quebec diocese. Laval sided with them and requested that Saint-Vallier leave his post. This of course offended him and he refused this request, backed by the King, who ‘exiled’ Mgr Laval in France and refused to permit his return to Quebec. Disappointed and angry, as he had expected to die at the Quebec church he had co-founded, Laval made many accusations that portrayed Saint-Vallier as a manipulative traitor.

Saint-Vallier was consecrated bishop at Saint-Sulpice on January 25, 1688 and allowed his predecessor to go back to Canada. However, this would prove to be detrimental for him as upon his return in the summer of 1688, there was a disagreement between him and the seminary of Quebec. Three priests and the Bishop Laval conspired together in order to undermine Saint-Vallier's authority and "three quarters of the clergy in Canada […] [had] already escaped the direct authority of the bishop, who found himself, in addition, obliged to share his jurisdiction over his own secular clergy with his seminary."

Autumn of 1688, Bishop Saint-Vallier initiated a turnover of the old system and replaced it with new changes in the organization of the seminary which the latter rejected with backing from the Bishop Laval. "Mgr de Saint-Vallier worked on establishing more strict and clear pastoral norms […] the directives that he fixed throughout his episcopate concentrate mainly on the administration of the sacraments, especially the sacrament of penitence, and on the preaching"
At that time, the Iroquois started attacking the French again and the impending approach of the English loomed ahead.

Attacked on every side and called a tyrant and a jansenist, he decided to seek for arbitration by higher religious authorities, in this case the Archbishop of Paris and the private confessor of the King, who "both decided in favour of the bishop on the essential points […], the seminary of Quebec lost its privileges and came [back] under the usual rule."

Nevertheless, by the end of 1694, Saint-Vallier's relation with his diocese had deteriorated to the point that Louis XIV was forced to recall him to Paris. While Saint-Vallier defended his actions, he was asked to resign, which he refused to do. After being kept in France until 1697, without consenting to resign, Saint-Vallier was allowed to return to Canada after agreeing to be more "prudent" and moderate in his ways. He returned to his see and authorized a new establishment of Ursulines at Trois-Rivières.

Quarrels with different institutions 

Saint-Vallier's tenure as bishop was defined by interminable quarrels with governmental and religious institutions in French North America. Even before he was officially consecrated as bishop, Saint-Vallier's active leadership style brought him into conflict with various groups, who perceived him as, at times, domineering and micromanaging.

He quarreled with Governor Frontenac over their respective social standing, going so far as to threaten to place an interdict on the Recollet order for giving the Governor precedence. He also clashed with the female religious order of the Congrégation de Notre-Dame. The order was active in teaching and nursing, and the Bishop sought to impose upon them a stricter cloistered lifestyle. In addition, he demanded they assent to dowry payments, solemn vows, and that they swear obedience to him as bishop. While the Congregation resisted, they were eventually forced to accept many of Saint-Vallier's dictates.

Upon his return from France, Saint-Vallier quickly became entangled in more intra-religious disputes. Further conflict arose in regard to competing claims to evangelization rights. In 1698, the seminary of Quebec requested permission to send a mission to the Tamaroa tribe. Saint-Vallier, who, after the "great quarrel" with the seminary, was eager to remain on good terms, consented. This was a slap in the face to the Jesuits, who felt their evangelizing efforts were under pressure worldwide from the secular church. Claiming the Tamaroas were included in the Illinois tribe, whose conversion had been entrusted to them, they objected. When the dispute was put to his arbitration, Saint-Vallier decided in favour of the Seminary. When the Jesuits appealed to the King Louis XIV in 1700, the Bishop returned to France to defend his decision. Although it was upheld, the damage done to his relation with the Jesuits was lasting.

While subject to much criticism, Saint-Vallier was also admired in his diocese for his dedication and self-sacrifice. Rather than staying in Quebec or Montreal, he tirelessly traveled the back-country. The founding of the Hôpital Général and installation of Jesuits and Recollets at Montreal were also to his credit.

Saint-Vallier and Jansenism 

There was a very strong suspicion in the colonies and in France that the Bishop of Quebec was in fact a follower of Jansenism. Named for Cornelius Jansen, a Dutch Catholic Bishop, Jansenism was characterized by a very strict and austere Christianity, a rigorism in the practice of religion and a certain individualism. The Critic Dictionary of Theology explain the large meaning of Jansenism thus: "designated an intern movement of Catholicism that refutes the necessity of certain condemnations and limits their range, and tries to present Christianity in its original form and closer to its objectives"

Opposed to the centralization of power and the absolutism, this religious movement was seen as a plague by the court of King Louis XIV and in New France, where the government system was strongly based on absolutism.

If Saint-Vallier presented Jansenist ideas, it was in certain aspects of his writing and in his austerity and deep orthodoxy, but he was certainly not a Jansenist. In the beginning of the 18th century the Bishop wrote 3 books; the Ritual, the Catechism and the ‘Statuts et ordonnances’. Because of his quarrels with the Jesuits, the Superior of the order decided to attack Saint-Vallier's authority by writing a long critic of those three books seeing them as a "lapse into Arianism, Pelagianism, Jansenism, Lutheranism, and Calvinism". Father Bouvart based his accusations on different passages of the works of the Bishop, for example this extract from the Catechism.

"Le nombre des réprouvez sera-t-il bien plus grand que celui des bienheureux ? Oui, le chemin de la perdition est large, au lieu que le chemin qui conduit à la vie éternelle est étroit."

(Will the number of the damned be much greater than the number of the blessed? Answer: Yes, the road to perdition is broad, whereas the road that leads to the everlasting life is narrow.)

Bishop Saint-Vallier eventually appealed to the Sorbonne to have his works rehabilitated. The doctors of the Faculty of Theology declared the Ritual and the Catechism perfectly orthodox and censured the critic of Bouvart. Nevertheless, Saint-Vallier decided to re-edit in 1713 the Ritual so as to cast away all doubts about his pretended Jansenist ideas. This book remained in use in the parishes until the middle of the 19th century.

Capture and detention 

On his return to New France, Saint-Vallier's vessel, along with other ships from the convoy sailing to the New France, was attacked by English naval forces and sent to England. There, he was made a diplomatic prisoner and placed under house arrest, as France was at war with England in the War of Succession of Spain.

With Saint-Vallier unable to rule from custody, the religious dimension of the diocese of Quebec fell into decay. The problem in the eyes of the Bishop and many of the priests was the lack of morality in the colony. They encountered much reluctance from the population, especially with the Natives, who were in disagreement with the clergy's fight against alcoholism, ‘indecency and immorality’ and their attempt to instill Christian practices into the tribes while ridding them of their own set of customs. The dispute over the sale of alcohol also created waves in the colonial population since the government and especially the merchants sought to use spirits as a way to maintain good relations with the Amerindian tribes.

The Bishop remained a prisoner in London for five years while Queen Anne ruled. During this time, the King of France and the war council were deliberately slowed negotiations for his release. Many people were happy to be rid of Saint-Vallier and his incessant disputes, and the Queen of England demanded in exchange for the Bishop of Quebec the return of the Baron de Méan, "a dangerous man for France’s interests". It was only in 1709 that the king decided to set the dean of Liège free, and in turn, the English returned Saint-Vallier. At that time, Saint-Vallier's diocese had deteriorated greatly especially after Bishop Laval's death in 1708. Despite his pleas, the king was reluctant to let him go back to New France for fear of new religious conflicts. Thus Saint-Vallier underwent a 'forced exile' for four years (1709-1713) before he could return.

Late life, death and epilogue 

After thirteen years of absence, Saint-Vallier finally returned to Quebec, having persuaded the king to give consent to his departure. He arrived in his Diocese tired and worn by the torments of the last 20 years of constant infighting. The disputes with the religious orders of New France, the government and the merchants gave way to a more peaceful period that lasted until his death, although he retained some of his old habits. He refused, for example, to ring the bell of the cathedral for the death of the governor Rigaud de Vaudreuil and "grudges subsisted between [him] and his seminary".

Austere throughout his life, he became more and more humble in his way of living and turned toward contemplation and simple duties. As Timothy Pearson explained in Becoming holy in early Canada: "Charity, both the love one bore for God and the public acts of altruistic gift-giving […] became the prominent trope of holiness after 1650". Saint-Vallier, following the example of the ‘Saints’, showed his generosity by helping the poor and the Hôpital Général of Quebec. He also took very seriously his duties of bishop and developed parishes in the farthest corners of the diocese. Weak from sickness, he died on 26 December 1727 in the Hôpital Général, which he founded. His last words showed his charity, for he said: "Forget me, but do not forget my poor".

The Abbot Gosselin who wrote about the Bishop Saint-Vallier in the late 19th century said of him: "especially by his great virtues and the holiness of his life, he is revealed in history with the halo of charity and disinterest: his memory shall be eternal"
(surtout par ses grandes vertus [...] et la sainteté de sa vie, [...] il nous apparaît dans l’histoire avec l’auréole de la charité et du désintéressement : sa mémoire sera immortelle)

See also 
Michel Bertier
Michel Sarrazin

References

Bibliography

 Biography at the Dictionary of Canadian Biography Online
 the  Catholic Encyclopedia - Jean-Baptiste de Saint-Vallier
Saint-Vallier, Jean-Baptiste de La Croix de Chevrières de. Catéchisme du diocèse de Québec par Monseigneur l’illustrissime & reverendissime Jean de La Croix de Saint Valier, évêque de Québec. Paris, Urbain Coustelier, 1702.
Saint-Vallier, Jean-Baptiste de La Croix de Chevrières de. Estat present de l’Eglise et de la colonie francoise dans la Nouvelle France, par M. l’Evêque de Quebec. Paris, Robert Pepie, 1688.
Saint-Vallier, Jean-Baptiste de La Croix de Chevrières de. Rituel du diocèse de Québec, publié par l’ordre de Monseigneur de Saint-Valier, évêque de Québec. 1re édition. Paris, Simon Langlois, 1703.
Saint-Vallier, Jean-Baptiste de La Croix de Chevrières de. Rituel du diocèse de Québec, publié par l’ordre de Monseigneur l’évêque de Québec. 2e édition. Paris, Simon Langlois, 1703 [vers 1713].
Saint-Vallier, Jean-Baptiste de La Croix de Chevrières de. Statuts, ordonnances et lettres pastorales de Monseigneur de Saint-Valier évêque de Québec pour le reglement de son diocese. Paris, Simon Langlois, 1703
Blouin, Annie. 1999. Les exigences pastorales de Mgr de Saint-Vallier envers ses prêtres, 1685–1727. Mémoire (M.A.)—Université de Laval, 1999.
Campeau, Lucien. "Bouvart, Martin" in Dictionary of Canadian Biography, vol. 2, University of Toronto/Université Laval, 2003. (accessed February 22, 2015) <http://www.biographi.ca/en/bio/bouvart_martin_2E.html.>
Choquette, Robert. Canada's Religion: An Historical Introduction. Ottawa: University of Ottawa Press, 2004.
Cliche, Marie-Aimée. 1988. Les pratiques de dévotion en Nouvelle-France: comportements populaires et encadrement ecclésial dans le gouvernement de Québec. Québec: Presses de l'Université Laval.
Fay, Terence. "A History of Canadian Catholics: Gallicanism, Romanism, and Canadianism : Volume 20 of History of religion". McGill-Queen's Press - MQUP, 2002.
Foley, Mary Anne, ""We Want No Prison Among Us": The Struggle for Ecclesiastical Recognition in Seventeenth-Century New France," Beyond the Walls: Women Religious in American Life 14 (Winter 1996); pp. 1-18. (Accessed February 5, 2015). <https://www.jstor.org/stable/25154538>
Gosselin, August. "Mgr. de Saint-Vallier et son temps". Nos Racines/Our Roots. (Accessed February 6, 2015). <http://www.ourroots.ca/f/toc.aspx?id=1702 >
Greer, Allan. 1985. Peasant, lord, and merchant: rural society in three Quebec parishes, 1740–1840. Toronto: University of Toronto Press.
Grès-Gayer, Jacques M., « Jansénisme », dans Jean-Yves Lacoste (dir.), Dictionnaire critique de théologie, Paris, Presses universitaires de France, 2002, p. 708-710.
La Charité, Claude, «Les deux éditions du Rituel du diocèse de Québec de Mgr de Saint-Vallier, datées de 1703 : de l’édition janséniste à l’édition revue et corrigée par la Compagnie de Jésus», Revue de Bibliothèque et Archives nationales du Québec, No. 3 : pp. 74–85.
Pearson, Timothy G. Becoming holy in early Canada. McGill-Queen's University Press, 2014.
Pearson, Timothy G. Becoming holy in early Canada: performance and the making of holy persons in society and culture. Thesis (Ph. D.)--McGill University, 2008.
Pritchard, James S. 2004. In search of empire: the French in the Americas, 1670–1730. Cambridge, UK: Cambridge University Press.
Rambaud, Alfred. "La Croix de Chevrières de Saint-Vallier, Jean-Baptiste De." Dictionary of Canadian Biography. (Accessed February 1, 2015).<http://www.biographi.ca/en/bio/la_croix_de_chevrieres_de_saint_vallier_jean_baptiste_de_2E .>
Scalberg, Daniel Allen. 1990. Religious life in New France Under the Laval and Saint-Vallier bishoprics : 1659–1727. Thesis (Ph. D.)-- University of Oregon, 1990
Scott, M. Eileen. "Barbier, Marie, de l’Assomption" in Dictionary of Canadian Biography, vol. 2, University of Toronto/Université Laval, 2003. (accessed February 20, 2015) <http://www.biographi.ca/en/bio/barbier_marie_2E.html.>
Tallon, Alain. 1997. La France et le Concile de Trente, 1518–1563. [Rome]: École française de Rome.
Thomas, James H., "Quebec's BIshop as Pawn: Sait-Vallier's Imprisonment in England 1704-1709," CCHA Historical Studies 64 (1998), pp. 151–160. (Accessed February 1, 2015). <http://www.cchahistory.ca/journal/CCHA1998/THOMAS.pdf>
Valois, Jacques. "Denys, Joseph" in Dictionary of Canadian Biography, vol. 2, University of Toronto/Université Laval, 2003. (accessed February 20, 2015) <http://www.biographi.ca/en/bio/denys_joseph_2E.html.>

Roman Catholic bishops of Quebec
17th-century Roman Catholic bishops in New France
18th-century Roman Catholic bishops in New France
1653 births
1727 deaths
Burials at the Cathedral-Basilica of Notre-Dame de Québec
Persons of National Historic Significance (Canada)